The Academy of Motion Picture Arts and Sciences (AMPAS) have presented their annual Academy Awards, commonly known as the Oscars, for over 90 years. The Academy Awards for Best Actor and Best Actress have been presented since the 1st ceremony in 1929, and the awards for Best Supporting Actor and Best Supporting Actress have been presented since the 9th ceremony in 1937. Of the 954 Academy Award nominees in an acting category, a total of 354 have received two or more acting nominations, 179 women and 175 men.

A three-time Oscar winner, Meryl Streep is the most nominated performer in the acting categories, with 21 nominations between 1979 and 2018. Streep's total includes a record 17 best actress nominations. Seven actors have won three or more Oscars in the acting categories, with Katharine Hepburn being the only person to win four acting Oscars, winning best actress for the fourth time at the 1982 ceremony. Ingrid Bergman and Meryl Streep both have two best actress and one best supporting actress win, and in 2021, Frances McDormand became only the second woman to win three best actress Oscars. Thelma Ritter has a record six best supporting actress nominations. The only women to have won two Oscars in the supporting actress category are Shelley Winters and Dianne Wiest. The seven women to have won in both the lead and supporting actress categories are Helen Hayes, Ingrid Bergman, Maggie Smith, Meryl Streep, Jessica Lange, Cate Blanchett and Renée Zellweger.

Jack Nicholson is the most nominated male performer in the acting categories with eight for best actor and four for best supporting actor, for a total of 12 nominations, winning three, two for best actor and one for best supporting actor. The record for most best actor nominations is nine, for both Spencer Tracy and Laurence Olivier (Olivier has a total of ten acting nominations). Daniel Day-Lewis has a record three best actor wins. Seven actors have each received four best supporting actor nominations, including Walter Brennan, who has a record three supporting actor wins. The six men to have won in both the lead and supporting actor categories are Jack Lemmon, Robert De Niro, Jack Nicholson, Gene Hackman, Kevin Spacey and Denzel Washington.

Peter O'Toole and Glenn Close jointly hold the record for most nominations in the acting categories without a win, with eight, followed by Richard Burton with seven, and Deborah Kerr, Thelma Ritter and Amy Adams with six. Both O'Toole and Kerr did receive the Academy Honorary Award.

Most nominations in four acting categories
Listed below are the 188 actors who have received three or more Academy Award nominations in the acting categories plus the seven actors who have two wins from two nominations.
BA = Best Actor/Actress nominations.
BSA = Best Supporting Actor/Actress nominations.

Most nominations for Best Actor and Best Supporting Actor combined

Most nominations for Best Actress and Best Supporting Actress combined

Most nominations by category (actor)
Listed are the actors with three or more nominations plus those with two wins from two nominations.

Most nominations by category (actress)

Actors with two or more acting nominations who have won Academy Awards in non-acting categories
TN = Total Nominations.
AN = Acting Nominations.

See also 

 List of actors with two or more Academy Awards in acting categories
 List of actors nominated for Academy Awards for foreign language performances
 List of directors with two or more Academy Awards for Best Director
 List of Academy Award records

Notes

ABette Davis' performance in Of Human Bondage (1934) and Paul Muni's performance in Black Fury (1935) were not nominated for Oscars. As a result of Davis's failure to get a nomination, several influential people campaigned to have her name included on the list, so for that year, and the following year also, the Academy allowed a write-in vote. Technically this meant that any performance was eligible. At the 6th, 7th and 8th Academy Awards, the Academy publicly announced those that placed second and third in the vote, Davis placed third ahead of one official nominee and Muni placed second, ahead of three official nominees, and both Davis and Muni are listed on the Academy's official database as write-in nominees who placed in the final voting. From the 9th Academy Awards, the nominating committees were no longer used and the entire membership of each individual branch voted for the nominees in their respective categories.
BLaurence Olivier received a total of 11 Oscar nominations, winning one. In addition to his 10 acting nominations, he received a Best Director nomination for Hamlet (1948). Prior to 1951, the Academy Award for Best Picture was credited to the production company, not individual producers, so Olivier was not credited for the Best Picture nomination for Henry V (1946) or Best Picture win for Hamlet. Olivier also received two Honorary Oscars; one for bringing Henry V to the screen, and a second in 1979 for Lifetime Achievement.
CDenzel Washington, Leonardo DiCaprio, Shirley MacLaine and Will Smith have all received an additional nomination in a non-acting category. MacLaine in the Best Documentary Feature category as co-director of the 1975 film The Other Half of the Sky: A China Memoir, and Washington, DiCaprio and Smith in the Best Picture category; Washington for co-producing Fences (2016), DiCaprio for co-producing The Wolf of Wall Street (2013), and Smith for co-producing King Richard (2021).
DActors who received multiple nominations without winning a competitive Oscar but did receive an honorary Oscar, are Greta Garbo (1955), Barbara Stanwyck (1982), Deborah Kerr (1994), Kirk Douglas (1996), Peter O'Toole (2003), Angela Lansbury (2013) and Gena Rowlands (2015), who all received the Academy Honorary Award, Rosalind Russell (1973), who received the Jean Hersholt Humanitarian Award, Judy Garland (1940), who received the Academy Juvenile Award, and Mickey Rooney, who received both the Academy Juvenile Award (1939) and the Academy Honorary Award (1983).
EAt the 2nd Academy Awards only the Best Actor and Best Actress winners were announced. There was no announcement of nominations. The official Academy site states that "although not official nominations, the additional names in each category, according to in-house records, were under consideration by various boards of judges". Although unofficial, Ruth Chatterton's nomination at the 2nd ceremony (the first of her two) counts towards her total in the above lists, and Paul Muni's nomination at the 2nd ceremony, counts as one of his five nominations in the above lists (his write-in vote from 1935 is not counted).
FRules at the time of the first three Academy Award ceremonies allowed for a performer to receive a single nomination for their work in more than one film. At the 1st ceremony, Emil Jannings won Best Actor for his work in two films and Janet Gaynor won Best Actress for her work in three films. Richard Barthelmess also received a nomination for two films at the 1st ceremony. At the 3rd ceremony, George Arliss, Maurice Chevalier, Ronald Colman, Greta Garbo and Norma Shearer all received a single nomination for their work in two films. This is why the Academy lists Colman and Garbo as three-time nominees and Shearer as a five-time nominee. Barthelmess, Arliss and Chevalier are one-time nominees, so do not feature in the above lists. No official reason was ever given as to why Arliss and Shearer were named Best Actor and Best Actress for only one of the two films for which they were listed.
GFrances McDormand, George Clooney, Emma Thompson, Warren Beatty, Brad Pitt, Matt Damon and Clint Eastwood have all won Oscars in non-acting categories. McDormand has seven Oscar nominations with four wins. In addition to her three Best Actress wins, she won for co-producing Best Picture winner Nomadland (2020). Clooney has eight Oscar nominations (four for acting, two for writing, one for directing and one for producing) with two wins. In addition to his win for Best Supporting Actor, he won Best Picture for co-producing Argo (2012). Thompson is a five-time nominee with two wins. In addition to her Best Actress win, she won the Academy Award for Best Adapted Screenplay for Sense and Sensibility (1995). Beatty is a 14-time nominee (four for acting, four for writing, four for producing and two for directing), winning Best Director for Reds (1981). Pitt is a seven-time Oscar nominee (four for acting, three for producing). In addition to his win for Best Supporting Actor, he won for co-producing Best Picture winner 12 Years a Slave (2013). Damon is a five-time nominee (three for acting, one for writing and one for co-producing 2016 Best Picture nominee Manchester by the Sea), winning the Academy Award for Best Original Screenplay (shared with Ben Affleck) for Good Will Hunting (1997). Eastwood is an 11-time nominee (five for producing, four for directing, two for acting), winning four; Best Director and Best Picture for Unforgiven  (1992) and Million Dollar Baby (2004). Both Eastwood (1995) and Beatty (2000) have also received the Irving G. Thalberg Memorial Award.
HBradley Cooper has a total of nine Oscar nominations. In addition to his four acting nominations, he has received a Best Adapted Screenplay nomination for A Star Is Born, and four nominations for Best Picture for co-producing American Sniper (2014), A Star Is Born (2018), Joker (2019), and Nightmare Alley (2021).
IAt the 1st Academy Award ceremony, Charlie Chaplin received four nominations (including Best Actor) for his film The Circus, before the Academy decided to remove his name from the competitive categories and instead honor him with a special award. A letter sent by the Academy to Chaplin told him that they had "Unanimously decided that your name should be removed from the competitive classes, and that a special award be conferred upon you for writing, acting, directing and producing The Circus. The collective accomplishments thus displayed place you in a class by yourself". Chaplin went on to receive nominations for Best Actor, Best Writing and Best Picture (the latter credited to Charlie Chaplin Productions) for the 1940 film The Great Dictator and a Best Writing nomination for the 1947 film Monsieur Verdoux. He received a second Honorary Oscar at the 44th Academy Awards in 1972, before winning his sole competitive Oscar at the 45th Academy Awards in 1973 for Best Original Dramatic Score for his 1952 film Limelight, which was eligible for that years Oscars because it was not released in Los Angeles until 1972.

References

External links
 www.oscars.org — official site

Academy Awards lists
Academy Award nominations